Mok Sau Hei (born 24 January 1941) is a former Hong Kong cyclist. He competed in the individual road race and team time trial events at the 1964 Summer Olympics.

References

External links
 

1941 births
Living people
Hong Kong male cyclists
Olympic cyclists of Hong Kong
Cyclists at the 1964 Summer Olympics
Place of birth missing (living people)